"I've Been Waiting for You" is a song recorded in 1974 by Swedish pop group ABBA, released first as the B-side to the single "So Long". It was included on their album ABBA, released April 1975.

In Australia, it was released as a single in 1975 with "King Kong Song" as its B-side, reaching number 49, and in New Zealand in 1977, where it reached number 8.

Fältskog sings the lead vocal on the song with guitars by Janne Schaffer. The cassette version of the album contains an extended version of the song that repeats the third verse and chorus.

Mamma Mia! Here We Go Again version
I've Been Waiting for You was released on July 13, 2018, alongside the soundtrack of Mamma Mia! Here We Go Again, by Capitol and Polydor Records. The song is performed by Amanda Seyfried, (Sophie) Julie Walters (Rosie) and Christine Baranski (Tanya) and it was produced by Benny Andersson. This version features revised lyrics by Andersson and Ulvaeus.

Personnel
 Agnetha Fältskog – lead vocals
 Anni-Frid Lyngstad – backing vocals
 Björn Ulvaeus – guitar     
 Benny Andersson – keyboards

Charts

Cover versions
 In 1977, Irish pop group Gina, Dale Haze and the Champions released their version of the song as a single, which made the top 10 in the Irish Charts.
 A Swedish country band called Nashville Train (which included some of ABBA's own backing band members) covered the song in 1977 on their album ABBA Our Way, released on the Polar Music label in Sweden.

In popular culture
 ABBA perform parts of the song live in the film ABBA: The Movie (1977).

External links
 Pictures of the record.
 Lyrics to "I've Been Waiting For You."

References

1970s ballads
1974 songs
ABBA songs
Polar Music singles
Pop ballads
Songs written by Benny Andersson and Björn Ulvaeus
Songs written by Stig Anderson